, literally "treasure island", is one of the Tokara Islands, belonging to Kagoshima Prefecture. The island, 7.14 km² in area, has a population of 116 persons. The island can only be reached by boat as it has no airport; there is regular ferry service to the city of Kagoshima on the mainland of Kyushu. Travel time is about 13 hours. The islanders are dependent mainly on fishing and seasonal tourism.

Geography
Its climate is classified as subtropical, with a rainy season from May through September.

History
Numerous ceramic shards and the foundations of dwellings from the late Jōmon period and Yayoi period indicate that Takarajima has been continuously inhabited for at least the past 2000 years. Until 1624, the island was part of the Ryukyu Kingdom.

During the Edo period, Takarajima was part of Satsuma Domain and was administered as part of Kawabe District. In August 1824, a British ship violated Japan’s national seclusion policy and sent a landing party of 20-30 men, who attempted to steal cattle from the islanders. In the ensuing conflict, one British sailor was killed. The incident was one of the contributing factors to the Tokugawa Shogunate issuing the Edict to Repel Foreign Vessels in 1825. The incident was also the subject of a novel by modern writer Akira Yoshimura.

In 1896, the island was transferred to the administrative control of Ōshima District, Kagoshima, and from 1911 was part of the village of Toshima, Kagoshima. From 1946-1952, the island was administered by the United States as part of the Provisional Government of Northern Ryukyu Islands.

References
National Geospatial Intelligence Agency (NGIA). Prostar Sailing Directions 2005 Japan Enroute. Prostar Publications (2005).

External links 

Official home page

Tokara Islands
Islands of Kagoshima Prefecture